Milk & Money is a 1996 American romantic comedy written and directed by Michael Bergmann and starring Robert Petkoff and Calista Flockhart.  Ted Hartley and Dina Merrill, who also appear in the film, served as producer and executive producer respectively.

Plot
David drops out of medical school and learns what life isn't really like. He meets beautiful women, helps make a film and takes care of twenty-one cows.

Cast
Robert Petkoff as David
Calista Flockhart as Christine
Peter Boyle as Belted Galloway
Robert Vaughn as Uncle Andre
Dina Merrill as Ellen, David's Mother
Robert Stattel as David's Father
Marin Hinkle as Carla
Denise Faye as Kimberly
Sarah Winkler as Nancy
Margaret Colin as Lorraine
Rob Gerlach as Julius
Daniel Zelman as Josh
Peter Frechette as Bookstore Clerk
Olympia Dukakis as Goneril Plogg
Carol Holmes as Kimberly's Mother
Harsh Nayyar as Hot Dog Vendor
Ted Hartley as Lingerie Salesman
Helen Holstein as herself

References

External links
 
 

American romantic comedy films
RKO Pictures films
1990s English-language films
1990s American films